The following events occurred in January 1937:

January 1, 1937 (Friday)
In retaliation for the Palos incident of the previous week, the German cruiser Königsberg forced the Spanish steamer Soton aground near Santander while the Graf Spee stopped another steamer, the Aragon, and forced it to change course to a Nationalist-held port.
The Public Order Act went into effect in the United Kingdom, banning the wearing of political uniforms and empowering the police to stop political marches when there is risk of disorder. 
Anastasio Somoza García became President of Nicaragua.
The Pittsburgh Panthers beat the Washington Huskies 21–0 in the 1937 Rose Bowl.
The Santa Clara Broncos defeated the LSU Tigers 21–14 in the Sugar Bowl.
The Duquesne Dukes edged the Mississippi State Bulldogs 13–12 in the Orange Bowl.
The 1st Cotton Bowl was played in Dallas, Texas. The TCU Horned Frogs beat the Marquette Golden Avalanche 16–6.
In the 3rd Sun Bowl, the Hardin-Simmons Cowboys beat the Texas Western Miners 34–6. 
 Alan Turing's seminal 1936 paper on the principles of modern computing was published entitled On Computable Numbers, with an Application to the Entscheidungsproblem in which is presented the concept of a Universal Turing Machine.
Born: Lenita Airisto, business leader and TV journalist, in Helsinki, Finland

January 2, 1937 (Saturday)
Great Britain and Italy signed a "gentleman's agreement" pledging to mutually respect one another's rights and interests in the Mediterranean as well as Spain's independence and integrity.
Died: Ross Alexander, 29, American actor (suicide)

January 3, 1937 (Sunday)
The Spanish Republican government called Germany's recent naval actions "acts of aggression and war." Germany sent a note offering to release the Aragon and cease attacks on Spanish shipping as soon as restitution was made for the cargo of the Palos not being fully returned. This proposal was rejected.
During the Second Battle of the Corunna Road, the Nationalists captured Villafranca del Castillo west of Madrid.
In China, 128 drug addicts were taken to a village near Tianjin and executed by firing squad.

January 4, 1937 (Monday)
France restored the Constitution of Lebanon after it had been suspended for a number of years.
The winners of the 2nd New York Film Critics Circle Awards were announced. Mr. Deeds Goes to Town was named Best Film of 1936.
The U.S. Supreme Court decided De Jonge v. Oregon.
Born: Grace Bumbry, opera singer, in St. Louis, Missouri; Dyan Cannon, actress, in Tacoma, Washington
Died: Paul Behncke, 67, German admiral

January 5, 1937 (Tuesday)
Nazi Germany recommended its artists depict at least four children in illustrations of German families.

January 6, 1937 (Wednesday)
U.S. President Franklin D. Roosevelt delivered the annual State of the Union address to Congress. "The statute of NRA has been outlawed", the president said. "The problems have not. They are still with us." Roosevelt said that means "must be found to adapt our legal forms and our judicial interpretation to the actual present national needs of the largest progressive democracy in the modern world."
The U.S. Congress strictly forbade the export of arms to Spain.
The Soviet Census of 1937 was held.
Born: Paolo Conte, singer and pianist, in Asti, Italy; Underwood Dudley, mathematician, in New York City
Died: André Bessette, 91, Canadian religious leader

January 7, 1937 (Thursday)
Princess Juliana of the Netherlands married Prince Bernhard of Lippe-Biesterfeld at The Hague.

January 8, 1937 (Friday)
President Roosevelt signed an amendment to the Neutrality Act to establish an embargo on the shipment of weapons to Spain. His signature came too late to stop the vessel Mar Cantabrico, which had already left New York with just such a cargo.
Born: Shirley Bassey, singer, in Tiger Bay, Cardiff, Wales

January 9, 1937 (Saturday)
Italy banned interracial marriage in its African colonies.
Leon Trotsky arrived in Mexico.

January 10, 1937 (Sunday)
France massed troops in French Morocco and threatened to occupy the Spanish side if the Nationalists refused to quickly oust the Germans reported in the territory. France feared that Germany was building up troops there under the guise of "volunteers" in preparation for a surprise attack on French Morocco.
The Spanish government ordered an evacuation of all citizens remaining in Madrid.
Britain warned its citizens that anyone volunteering to fight for either side in the Spanish Civil War would be subject to prosecution under the Foreign Enlistment Act of 1870.

January 11, 1937 (Monday)
Adolf Hitler assured France that Germany had no intention of seizing Morocco.
The United States invalidated all passports to Spain.
The first issue of Look magazine went on sale in the United States.

January 12, 1937 (Tuesday)
The Finnish cargo ship Johanna Thorden ran aground in the Pentland Firth in northern Scotland, broke in two and sank with the loss of about 30 lives. 
Died: Martin Johnson, 52, American adventurer and documentary filmmaker (plane crash)

January 13, 1937 (Wednesday)
At the Temple of Heaven in Beijing, a crowd of 50,000 onlookers watched as authorities burned 10,000 ounces of drugs and then executed 5 drug traffickers.
Pope Pius XI left his sickbed for the first time in a month.
Born: George Barr, science fiction and fantasy artist, in Tucson, Arizona; George Reisman, economist, in New York City; Ati George Sokomanu, President of Vanuatu, in Vanuatu

January 14, 1937 (Thursday)
Hermann Göring held conferences in Rome with Benito Mussolini and Galeazzo Ciano to discuss policy toward the Spanish Civil War.
Born:
Ken Higgs, cricketer, in Kidsgrove, England (d. 2016)
Tom "Mongoo$e" McEwen, American drag racer (d. 2018)

January 15, 1937 (Friday)
The Second Battle of the Corunna Road ended indecisively.
The French Chamber of Deputies voted unanimously to give Prime Minister Léon Blum power to halt the flow of volunteers from or through France to fight in the Spanish Civil War.
Born: Margaret O'Brien, actress, in San Diego, California

January 16, 1937 (Saturday)
Two days of voting in the Finnish presidential election concluded. The result was a victory for Kyösti Kallio.
The French Colonial Ministry confirmed reports that it was studying plans to offer land on Madagascar and other French colonies for settlement by Jews.

January 17, 1937 (Sunday)
A prison riot broke out near Guelph, Canada. Inmates started fires and fought police for ten hours until order was restored. An estimated $250,000 in damage was done and it was feared that 200 of the prison's 700 inmates had escaped.
The Soviet Union sent Britain a note on the Spanish Civil War explaining that the Soviet government, although it "presently does not practice the dispatchment of volunteer detachments, does not consider it expedient to adopt unilateral prohibitive measures."
The melodrama film Black Legion starring Humphrey Bogart premiered in New York City.
Died: Richard Boleslawski, 47, Polish director and actor

January 18, 1937 (Monday)
The Ohio River flood began when the river exceeded the flood stage of 52 feet.
Hitler authorized the creation of Adolf Hitler Schools, special new schools for gifted boys 12 to 18 that would prepare them for the NS-Ordensburgen.
Born: Yukio Endō, artistic gymnast, in Akita City, Japan (d. 2009); John Hume, politician and Nobel laureate, in Derry, Northern Ireland (d. 2020)

January 19, 1937 (Tuesday)
Howard Hughes set a new transcontinental aviation record by flying from Los Angeles to New York in 7 hours, 28 minutes and 25 seconds.
British Parliament convened for its first session of the New Year. Anthony Eden gave a speech on the foreign situation saying that the future of the continent lay with Germany, who "has it in her power to influence a choice which will decide not only her fate, but that of Europe. If she chooses co-operation with other nations, full and equal co-operation, there is nobody in this country who will not assist wholeheartedly to remove misunderstandings and to make the way smooth for peace and prosperity." 
Nap Lajoie, Tris Speaker and Cy Young were elected to the Baseball Hall of Fame.
Born: Giovanna Marini, singer-songwriter, in Rome, Italy

January 20, 1937 (Wednesday)
The Second inauguration of Franklin D. Roosevelt was held. It was the first to take place on January 20 as per the Twentieth Amendment to the United States Constitution instead of March 4. In the best-known line of Roosevelt's second inauguration speech he said, "I see one-third of a nation ill-housed, ill-clad, ill-nourished."
Born: Bailey Howell, basketball player, in Middleton, Tennessee

January 21, 1937 (Thursday)
France placed an embargo on arms and volunteers in the Spanish Civil War.
Music for Strings, Percussion and Celesta by Hungarian composer Béla Bartók premiered in Basel, Switzerland.
Born: Prince Max, Duke in Bavaria, heir to the Bavarian royal house, in Munich, Germany
Died: Marie Provost, 38, Canadian-born film actress (acute alcoholism)

January 22, 1937 (Friday)
41,000 people around Cincinnati were left homeless by the Ohio River flood. The business district of Pittsburgh and part of Louisville, Kentucky were also flooded out.
Born: Joseph Wambaugh, author, in East Pittsburgh, Pennsylvania

January 23, 1937 (Saturday)
The second Moscow Trial began. 17 lesser communist leaders known as the Anti-Soviet Trotskyist Center were charged with an anti-Stalin conspiracy. 
The entire Japanese cabinet resigned due to a split between military leaders and anti-military political parties in the National Diet who thought that the army had too much influence over the government.

January 24, 1937 (Sunday)
Bulgaria and Yugoslavia signed a treaty of friendship.

January 25, 1937 (Monday)
The soap opera Guiding Light premiered on NBC Radio. It would make the jump to television in 1952 and become the longest-running soap opera in history by the time of its cancellation in 2009.
Born: Ange-Félix Patassé, politician, in Paoua, Ubangi-Shari (d. 2011)
Died: Addison Burkhardt, 57, American librettist and lyricist

January 26, 1937 (Tuesday)
The Ohio River reached a crest of 79.99 feet. Most of the region was without electricity.
The Japanese military declined to accept General Kazushige Ugaki as Prime Minister by refusing to supply a war minister. Ugaki was therefore unable to form a cabinet.

January 27, 1937 (Wednesday)
The 1935 salaries of Hollywood movie stars were made public as part of a Congressional study on salaries paid by corporations. Greta Garbo topped the list at $332,500, followed by Wallace Beery ($278,749), Joan Crawford ($241,403), William Powell ($238,750) and Clark Gable ($211,553).
The Duke of Norfolk married Lavinia Mary Strutt at Brompton Oratory in London. 5,000 women jostled each other and fought police outside the venue in an effort to get a glimpse of the proceedings.
Born: John Ogdon, pianist and composer, in Mansfield Woodhouse, England (d. 1989)

January 28, 1937 (Thursday)
In a National Hockey League game between the Montreal Canadiens and Chicago Black Hawks, Canadiens star Howie Morenz caught his skate in the boards and broke four bones in his leg. Morenz was hospitalized and would die five weeks later from a blood clot.

January 29, 1937 (Friday)
The Japanese aircraft carrier  entered service.
The drama film The Good Earth, based on the novel of the same name by Pearl S. Buck, premiered in Los Angeles.
Born: Bobby Scott, jazz musician, record producer and songwriter, in Mount Pleasant, New York (d. 1990)
Died: Aleen Cust, 68, Irish veterinary surgeon

January 30, 1937 (Saturday)
The Trial of the Anti-Soviet Trotskyist Center ended. 13 of the 17 defendants were sentenced to execution by firing squad.
The Associated Press reported a total of 333 known deaths across eight U.S. states from the recent flooding. 225 of the deaths were in Kentucky.
On the fourth anniversary of the Nazis coming to power, Adolf Hitler made a speech in which he formally renounced Article 231 of the Treaty of Versailles.
Hitler banned Germans from accepting Nobel Prizes.
Born: Vanessa Redgrave, actress and political activist, in Greenwich, London, England; Boris Spassky, chess grandmaster, in Leningrad, USSR
Died: Georgy Pyatakov, 46, Ukrainian Communist leader (executed)

January 31, 1937 (Sunday)
The Dimitrov Battalion joined the XV International Brigade in Spain.
Born: Philip Glass, composer, in Baltimore, Maryland; Suzanne Pleshette, actress, in New York City (d. 2008)

References

1937
1937-01
1937-01